Jennifer Couëlle, (born in Italy), is a children's book author based in Montreal, Canada. Her albums and collections of poems have been published in France and Canada.

Biography 
Couëlle is granddaughter of the French architect Jacques Couëlle, and daughter of the painter Jérôme Couëlle. She is an art historian. She completed her master's thesis on "Kitsch as a Modernist Device" at the Université du Québec à Montréal in 1991.

From 1989 to 2001, she was an art and theater critic for numerous publications, including art press, Canadian Art, Cahiers de théâtre Jeu, Variable Sky, Sculpture Space, Esse, ETC, Parachute, Possibles, Spirale and Vie des arts. She has also been a cultural journalist for Le Devoir, Elle Québec and La Presse.

During this period, she also curated several exhibitions, including L'Empreinte du vide (André Jasinski), Mois de la photo in Montreal, Galerie Clark and Galerie Trois Points (1999); Antidote (lightness at work), and Galerie Plein Sud (1998); Tattoos (Mark Garland), Gallery B-312 (1997) and Louis Muhlstock, The Draftsman / Un dessinateur at the Saidye Bronfman Arts Center (1989).

Works in French 

 Le cœur dans la tête, Éditions Pour penser à l'endroit, Cholet, 2005 
 La souris qui vit plus loin que le bout de son nez, Éditions Pour penser à l'endroit, Cholet, 2005 
 Un chat sous les draps, Planète rebelle, Montréal, 2007 
 "Poèmes", Riveneuve Continents n° 6, Riveneuve Éditions, Paris, 2008 
 Ballons au ciel, Planète rebelle, Montréal, 2008 
 "Garçon à la mer", Riveneuve Continents n° 8, Riveneuve Éditions, Paris, 2009 
 Je t'aime comme toi, Planète rebelle, Montréal, 2009 
 C'est bleu c'est vert, Planète rebelle, Montréal, 2009 
 Coucou bonheur !, Planète rebelle, Montréal, 2010 
 Noël : Biscuits pas cuits et autres récits, Éditions de la Bagnole, Montréal, 2011 .
 Mon meilleur meilleur ami, Planète rebelle, Montréal, 2011 
 Princesse Paola à la maternelle, Planète rebelle, Montréal, 2012 
 Cent enfants imaginent comment changer le monde, Éditions de la Bagnole, Montréal, 2013 
 Palin – Un caprice au dentifrice, Éditions de la Bagnole, Montréal, 2013 
 Palin – Une sortie sens dessus dessous, Éditions de la Bagnole, Montréal, 2013 
 Papoumamie, Planète rebelle, Montréal, 2013 
 Palin – Le tricot rouge, Éditions de la Bagnole, Montréal, 2013 
 Palin – Je veux un animal de compagnie !, Éditions de la Bagnole, Montréal, 2013 
 La magie de Sami, Planète rebelle, Montréal, 2014 
 Le bisou, Dominique et Compagnie, Saint-Lambert, 2014 
 L’homme sans chaussettes, éditions de l’Isatis, Montréal, 2015 
 Peinture comme printemps, Dominique et compagnie, Saint-Lambert, 2017 
 Sans manches comme l'été, Dominique et compagnie, Saint-Lambert, 2017 
 Tricoté comme l'automne, Dominique et compagnie, Saint-Lambert, 2017 
 Ange comme hiver, Dominique et compagnie, Saint-Lambert, 2017 
Le monde de Méry, Dominique et compagnie, Saint-Lambert, 2019 
Espoir, Dominique et compagnie, Saint-Lambert, 2020

Works in English 
Kiss, Kiss translation of Le Bisou by Karen Simon, illustrator Jacques Laplante. Pajama

References

External links 

 

Living people
Canadian art critics
Canadian theatre critics
Canadian art historians
Université du Québec à Montréal alumni
Year of birth missing (living people)